is an anime adaptation of the Lord of Vermilion series by Square Enix. The series follows Chihiro Kamina, a seemingly normal college student living in Tokyo. His life turns into total chaos following the apocalyptic event known as The Great Collapse, and his hidden powers are later awakened. After encountering other people with powers like his own, Chihiro must find the will to survive and achieve his destiny as the Lord of Vermilion.

Plot
Thirteen years ago, Chihiro Kamina moved in with his best friend after a disastrous accident. Present day, he is just a normal college student in Tokyo. However, on January 29, a mysterious ringing sound knocks out people across the city including him, resulting in the emergence of a mysterious red mist. Comatose victims began to awaken only a week after the incident, with Chihiro waking up almost five months after. The incident, now known as the Great Collapse, caused giant plants to appear from out of nowhere, trapping those in the red mist. When Chihiro is given a seemingly fatal wound, his life turns into total chaos and he must now fight against those with powers similar to those he has just awakened, and must find a way to protect himself and achieve his destiny.

Characters

Malthus Church

 Chihiro has grey hair and purple eyes. When transformed, his main blood armament is a spike extending from the elbow down, taking the place of his arm. He has a massive amount of raw power, making him the most likely candidate to become the Lord of Vermilion. Thirteen years ago, his mother Mitsuki worked with Dr. Grummen and he was close friends with Grummen's daughter Yuri, but Mitsuki was swallowed by another world. His grief-stricken father then attempted to kill him. In the present day, he is in his second year at the Jokei University and one of the people who lost consciousness during the ‘Dai Kyoumei’ (lit. great resonance). Five months later, he wakes up from his comatose state.

 He has black hair and grey eyes. When transformed, his main blood armament is a two-handed katana like sword. He is a close friend of Chihiro's and the two share a brotherly relationship.

She has burgundy hair and eyes and freckles across the bridge of her nose. She lives at the Malthus Church. Her blood armament is not a conventional weapon. Her blood forms into a swarm of butterflies, which she can telepathically direct to targets and detonate.

 

He dresses in a suit but wears the jacket draped casually around his shoulders and is almost always seen smoking. His blood armament lets him create large fists for punching. He is a freelance journalist with a special interest in Chihiro after the incident thirteen years ago when his parent were found dead.

 He has thick red hair and brown eyes. He is a physician at the Jokei University Hospital, which is attached to the university Chihiro attends. He tended Chihiro during the five months he was in a coma. His blood armament enhances his hands into claws.

 She has long black hair and purple eyes, although there is an eyepatch over her left eye. Her blood armament is a whip with a pointed tip like a devil's tail. She is a nurse at Jokei University Hospital who works with Inuki and has notoriously bad bedside manners concerning her patients.

AVAL Science Foundation
The members of this group are often known as agents of Chaos.

Yuri has long black hair and dresses in a white shirt with a blue ribbon around her collar. Her blood armament are shuriken. She can also create and throw swarms of shuriken-shaped projectiles, string them together into chains, or bunch them together to make shields. She can also lengthen the arms of one into a sword. The daughter of AVAL leader Grummen, she and Chihiro played together as children and she is still in love with him.

 He wears a leather jacket and sunglasses, giving off the impression of a biker. He is actually the leader of the Blue Skull biker gang. His blood armament are a pair of massive clawed hands that grow from his back which he can manipulate. He and Inuki were raised together in the same orphanage and share a close, brother-like relationship.

Haru has spiky blonde hair and wears a blue bandanna over his forehead. His blood armament allows him to generate large fists for punching and he can also condense blood in spheres to entrap and drown his opponent. He is a fan of the Blue Skulls biker gang, which Jun is a member of, leading to him allying with Jun and AVAL. He has a near fanatic loyalty to Jun.

He wears a long coat, black hat, and a scarf that typically covers the lower half of his face. He also has dark hair. His blood armament is wires that form together into a massive scythe far larger than he is. He also has a female familiar named Amadeus who typically wields the scythe. He is able to do a Spell of Binding, using his music to draw on the grief and guilt his opponents feel to paralyze them, this was especially effective against Chihiro. A famous pianist, he tells his opponents he will play a requiem for them and refers to himself as a Shinigami (God of Death). He enjoys seeing despair on his opponents' faces.

She has short black hair and wears an outfit reminiscent of a maid. Her blood armament lets her fire electrified blood bullets and create shields. She is an artificial human created by using Professor Mitsuki and Grummen's DNA, making her a substitute for Mitsuki. She is extremely intelligent with an air of quiet smugness. She considered Koume a defective life.

Guardian State

 She is a policewoman with long straight black hair that reaches her thighs and always carries a pistol. She has a winged lion familiar named Pluto. Her blood armament is a large lance.

She addressees herself in third person and has short black hair with a butterfly hairclip above her left ear. She has a small doll-like familiar named Densuke. Her blood armament is a pair of bladed tonfa but she can also shoot an energy beam.

She has short black hair and was a friend of Haru's before he joined AVAL. Akira can release explosive waves of blood. Her familiar Elsbernd has the ability to shapeshift and made himself look like Chihiro during the assault on the Infinity Theater.

She has long blonde hair and blue-green eyes. She has an angel-like familiar named Gabriel with six wings. Her blood armament is a bow. She can release an arrow into the air and have it break apart into dozens of arrows that strike a single target multiple times.

He has short blonde hair and blue eyes. He has a familiar reminiscent of a lizard with Aztec markings named Lia Fail. His blood armament is a spear.

Secondary characters

Dux is the leader of the Malthus Church, a being of unknown origin. She appears to want to protect the world, though her actions are vindictive. She enjoys watching the Heroes fight against fate as the timeline is repeated and they continually die. She carries a red umbrella and wears a gold mask that hides her eyes. She has the ability to enter dreams and teleport.

Drail is the adviser to Grummen. He wears dark purple, is full of tattoos and piercings and is always standing in the shadows. He never enters combat but has the ability to teleport and enjoys watching destruction. He manipulated Grummen into creating AVAL so he could watch more destruction.

He is the leader of AVAL and the father of Yuri. He is in love with Chihiro's mother Mitsuki, having worked with her thirteen years ago to create a gate to another world. After she was absorbed into said world, he set everything that happens into motion to bring her back.

She was not voiced in the anime.
She was the mother of Chihiro Kamina and an associate of Dr. Grummen. They worked together on making a gate to another world but an explosion led to Mitsuki being swallowed by the gate, which became the trigger for Grummen creating AVAL. Her son Chihiro often played with Grummen's daughter Yuri before this occurrence and she would make them hot chocolate. Her son and husband outlived her. Grummen used her and his DNA to create Chiyu. It has been implied she loved Grummen and that she did not, it is not confirmed either way.

As Tsubasa, she has short brown hair and eyes, but in her true form of Aero her hair turns green and her arms become feathery wings. She is a photographer journalist who follows Isshin Kakihara and takes pictures for him. However, she becomes a harpy-like familiar bound to Kakihara after the Great Resonance. She can manipulate wind into offensive blades. Aero does not know what happened to Tsubasa's mind after she awoke.

In her human form, she has brown hair tied back in the braid and brown eyes. In her true form of Cerdid she has long blonde hair tied back in two ponytails and pointed elven ears. She poses as a second-year student at Jokei University in the same seminar as Chihiro but in actuality, she is Cerdid, a Defender assigned to Chihiro. She is capable of healing.

Ikurō is a friend of Chihiro and Kotetsu, attending the same university as them. He is turned into a partial familiar early on in the series and remains in a coma for the rest as Inuki and later Koume tries to find a way to return him to fully human. His fate is a great source of pain for Chihiro, who believes Ikurō was harmed because he was close to him.

Yato lives in the Dōmyōji dojo and helps out there. He is attacked when Kotetsu's father turns into a monster and wounded but survives. He denies remembering anything, blocking the memory. He is not seen again. He has wavy brown hair and commonly wears sunglasses, dressing casually in a T-shirt and cargo shorts.

Kotetsu's father, he ran the Dōmyōji dojo until he was turned into a familiar by Jun and killed by Chihiro. Thirteen years ago, after Chihiro's parents died, Rakan became his legal guardian and he has been living in the dojo since.

Anime
A 12-episode anime television series adaptation of the arcade game has been announced, with Eiji Suganuma directed the series at Asread and Tear Studio. Masashi Suzuki is in charge of the series composition, and Toshie Kawahara is in charge of the character designs. The series aired from July 13 to September 28, 2018. Crunchyroll streamed the series, while Funimation the English dub.

Notes

References

External links
 Official anime and film website
 

Adventure anime and manga
Anime television series based on video games
Asread
Fantasy anime and manga
Funimation
Tear Studio
Tokyo MX original programming
Works based on Square Enix video games